Ciciliano is a  (municipality) in the Metropolitan City of Rome in the Italian region of Latium, located about  east of Rome.

Ciciliano borders the following municipalities: Capranica Prenestina, Castel Madama, Cerreto Laziale, Pisoniano, Sambuci, San Gregorio da Sassola.

It was most likely founded by the ancient Aniensis tribe and became the Roman town of Trebula Suffenas. 

At one time, it was a stronghold of the Saracens.

See also
History of Islam in southern Italy
Saracinesco
Nocera Inferiore

References

External links
 Official website

Cities and towns in Lazio
Arabs in Italy